The Barber is a 1916 short comedy film by William D. Foster. The silent film was shot in black and white.

The film's story depicts a barber overhearing a customer who seeks a Spanish language teacher for his wife, imposters, and hijinks.

The film was funded in part by Henry "Teenan" Jones, owner of The Elite Café. The film stars Anna Holt, Howard Kelly, and Edgar Lillison

References

1916 short films
1916 comedy films
Silent American comedy films
African-American comedy films
Films about hairdressers